Batam City Condominium, also known as BCC, is a  tall condominium in Lubuk Baja, Batam.

The air conditioning system in the building is centralized. It also has a 3,000 kVA electric generator for backup.

Facilities 
BCC has 152 hotel rooms and 123 apartment units. The apartment service on the 1st to the 5th floor is devoted to long stay guests, while units on the 6th floor to the 11th floor are used for residences. Furthermore, rooms on the 12th floor and above are used for hotel services.

See also 
 Batam
 List of tallest buildings in Batam
 List of tallest buildings in Indonesia
 Meisterstadt

References 

Residential buildings completed in 2011
Batam
Buildings and structures in the Riau Islands
Residential buildings in Indonesia